The 2022 United States Senate election in Hawaii was held on November 8, 2022, to elect a member of the United States Senate to represent the state of Hawaii. The primary took place on August 13.

Incumbent Democrat Brian Schatz won re-election to a second full term in a landslide, winning 71.2% of the vote to Republican state representative Bob McDermott’s 26%.

Schatz was originally appointed to the Senate in 2012 following the death of incumbent Daniel Inouye. He won a special election to finish Inouye's term in 2014, won his first full term in 2016, and ran for reelection for his second full term in 2022.

Democratic primary

Candidates

Nominee 
Brian Schatz, incumbent U.S. Senator

Eliminated in primary 
Brandon Makaawaawa
Steve Tataii, teacher and perennial candidate

Endorsements

Results

Republican primary

Candidates

Nominee

Eliminated in primary
Zachary Burd
Wallyn Kanoelani Christian, realtor
Timothy Dalhouse, retired Army veteran
Shaena Dela Cruz
Adriel Lam
Asia Lavonne, pastor
Edward Pirkowski
John Roco

Results

Libertarian primary

Candidates

Nominee
 Feena Bonoan, U.S. Navy veteran, filmmaker, and candidate for Hawaii Senate in 2020

Disqualified 
 Michael Kokoski, nominee for this seat in 2014

Results

Green primary

Candidates

Nominee
Emma Jane Pohlman, attorney

Results

Aloha ʻĀina primary

Candidates

Nominee
Dan Decker, former chair of the Aloha ʻĀina

Results

Nonpartisan primary

Candidates

Disqualified 
 Dennis Miller
 Steve Tataii

General election

Predictions

Endorsements

Results

See also 
 2022 United States Senate elections

References

External links 
Official campaign websites
 Feena Bonoan (L) for Senate
 Bob McDermott (R) for Senate
 Brian Schatz (D) for Senate

2022
Hawaii
United States Senate